Kyle Evans (born 26 September 1993) is a British BMX rider from Hindley, Greater Manchester, who represents Great Britain in international competitions. He competed in the men's time trial event at the 2015 UCI BMX World Championships. 

Evans was selected for the British cycling team at the 2016 Summer Olympics in Rio de Janeiro, competing in the men's BMX race. After grabbing a twenty-first seed in the opening round with a time of 35.776, Evans scored a total of 19 placing points to take the penultimate spot against seven other riders in his quarter-final heat. He was thus eliminated from the tournament. Evans made an appearance on the ‘Question of Sport’ episode that aired on 14 November 2018. He acted as a batonbearer for the 2022 Commonwealth Games Queen's Baton Relay when the baton came to Kidsgrove.

References

External links
 
 Kyle Evans at British Cycling
 
 
 

1993 births
Living people
BMX riders
British male cyclists
Olympic cyclists of Great Britain
Cyclists at the 2016 Summer Olympics
People from Hindley, Greater Manchester
Sportspeople from Greater Manchester
21st-century British people